Jaime Roldós Aguilera (5 November 1940 – 24 May 1981) was 33rd President of Ecuador from 10 August 1979 until his death on 24 May 1981. In his short tenure, he became known for his firm stance on human rights.

Early life and career
Roldós was born in Guayaquil on 5 November 1940. He attended high school at the Vicente Rocafuerte National School. He studied law and social sciences at the University of Guayaquil. He was an excellent student and won many awards, medals and scholarships.

At the age of 37, he ran for president on a populist platform. In the first round, he received the greatest number of votes, but not the 50% plus one needed to avoid a runoff.

In December 1978, during the nine-month interval between the first and second rounds of the election, an alleged plot to assassinate him, supposedly by eight Americans (who were later charged with archeologic relics trafficking) was reportedly foiled by the military government.

He won the second round of elections against Sixto Durán Ballén, and assumed office on 10 August 1979 in a ceremony attended by several world dignitaries, among them American Secretary of State Cyrus Vance (with First Lady Rosalynn Carter accompanying) and Spanish Prime Minister Adolfo Suárez.

Presidency (1979–1981) 
On 10 October 1979, Roldós signed a decree reducing the workweek to 42 hours. On 2 November 1979, he issued another decree doubling the minimum wage, to 4,000 sucres per month. ($160 in 1979 US dollars). On 8 March 1980, he established the National Development Plan. On 15 April 1980, he established a committee of notables to search for a solution for the power struggle in the National Congress, presided over by his former mentor Assad Bucaram.

He named 1981 the "year of advances". In late January and early February 1981, there were border skirmishes with Peru, in the Cordillera del Cóndor. Clashes occurred in the regions of Paquisha, Mayaycu, and Machinatza. With great skill and diplomacy he left the territorial dispute to the arbitration by the Organization of American States.

Roldós's most important accomplishment was his policy in support of human rights, in an era in which most Latin American countries were military dictatorships. In September 1980, Roldós met with the democratically elected presidents of the Andean region (Venezuela, Colombia, and Peru), proposed the signing of a Charter of Conduct, in which the principles of universal justice and human rights were re-affirmed, signaling protection of human rights as a more important principle than non-intervention. His stance on human-rights led him to clash with fellow Latin American leaders: in one instance at a summit in Colombia, El Salvador’s José Napoleón Duarte (US-backed dictator who came to power with the coup that set off the Salvadoran Civil War) mocked Roldós for being young and inexperienced. Roldós answered: “I may be inexperienced, but my government perches on a mountain of popular votes, while yours is perched on a mountain of corpses.”

This policy was questioned by American conservatives, who considered it an excuse to justify Soviet meddling in the region, especially in Central America. The United States condemned the "Roldós doctrine", as they did that of Panamanian Omar Torrijos, who also died in a plane crash several months later.  Following the 1980 U.S. presidential elections appointing Ronald Reagan, bilateral relations with the USA became strained; Roldós declined to attend Reagan's January 1981 inauguration on these grounds. His foreign policy initiatives also attracted the Sandinista government of Nicaragua and with the Frente Democrático in El Salvador, which opposed the military regime in that country.

Death

On Sunday, 24 May 1981 a Beechcraft Super King Air carrying the president and his entourage to a military ceremony in honor of the fallen in the short war with Peru crashed into Huairapungo Hill, near the town of Guachanamá, in the Celica Canton of Loja Province. The crash, at 2360 meters over sea level (7800 ft.), left no survivors.  Killed along with the president were First Lady Martha Bucaram, the Minister of Defense Marco Subía Martinez and his wife, two aide-de-camps, a flight attendant and both pilots. The bodies were reportedly burned beyond recognition.

Investigation and irregularities
The controversy about the cause of the crash began immediately when the Accident Investigation Committee (Junta Investigadora de Accidentes, JIA) of the Ecuadorian Air Force attributed the crash to navigational pilot error. There were also rumors that the Colombian M-19 leftist guerrilla was involved in the crash, but these accounts were dispelled by authorities.

Arosemena inquiry (first investigation)
A parliamentary commission was formed months later, led by then-MP and former President Otto Arosemena, following pressure from the families of the victims and political groups allied with the president. It found contradictions and inconsistencies in the JIA report, but could not reach definitive conclusions especially since the aircraft that was purchased by the Air Force to operate as a VIP transport lacked black box equipment. A team of the Zurich Police also conducted an investigation and concluded that the plane's motors were shut down when the plane crashed into the mountain. This opinion, which contradicted the Air Force Report, was not investigated further by the Ecuadorian government.

Granda inquiry (second investigation)
A second parliamentary inquiry, led by socialist MP Victor Granda, was formed in 1990 to review the findings of the Arosemena commission and the military investigations. The final 26-volume report, published in August 1992, found several inconsistencies and voids in the initial findings but didn’t establish a definitive conclusion. It criticized the Arosemena commission for its lack of further investigation into the Zurich police findings. Granda has also questioned former President Osvaldo Hurtado (who had succeeded Roldós) for its failure to question or expose the failures of the Ecuadorian Air Force flight security protocols that led to the crash. 

Specifically, the Granda commission found that in the contracting process of the King Air bought by the Air Force, several high ranking Air Force officers stated that the black box equipment wasn’t acquired with the plane because it was considered “optional” among other spares and equipment (when it should have carried one as it was functioning as presidential transport). The investigation reportedly found that the two additional pages of the acquisition expedient,  the ones with the optional equipment list, weren’t rubricated (initialed and/or highlighted in red) by any officer; so the commission asked the Air Force to demand a certification from Beechcraft whether it had provided a black box. The Air Force relayed Beechcraft’s response: that they had no record of selling or providing one. In spite of this, and that none was found at the crash site, Granda still contends a black box “may have existed”.

Operation Condor
The documentary The Death of Jaime Roldós, which was reportedly financed by an IDFA grant, premiered in 2013 and explores Roldós' death using interviews, archives and documentary research. It was directed by Manolo Sarmiento, who is close to the Roldós family. According to the film, the Ecuadorian military was heavily sympathetic, if not directly involved, with Operation Condor, the regional repressive apparatus set up by the military dictatorships of the Southern Cone countries (Argentina, Bolivia, Brazil Chile, Paraguay and Uruguay). Consequently, and according to Richelieu Levoyer; who happened to be Commander-in-Chief of the Ecuadorian Army at the time of the crash, Argentinians and Chileans involved themselves in the conspiracy to end Roldós’ regime, as they saw it sympathetic to left-wing causes and governments.

New inquiries, revelations and theories
Almost immediately after the screening, Attorney General Galo Chiriboga announced his decision to reopen the investigation. In April 2015, he announced to the National Assembly that, based on an alleged CIA document declassified in 2014, Ecuador had joined Operation Condor in mid-January 1978. According this document, participation would had occurred through the intelligence services of the Armed Forces; for this purpose, it is alleged (and also reported in the documentary) that  “an Argentine general would have visited Quito and installed, in the Ministry of Defense, a telecommunications system (named “Condortel”). The Navy was in charge of telecommunications, while the Air Force was in charge of psychological warfare.” Additionally, an offer by Chile’s Augusto Pinochet to train Ecuadorian personnel at the Military Intelligence School in Santiago would have followed.

In May 2016, on the 35th anniversary of the crash, Attorney General Chiriboga announced the discovery of several documents, audiovisual and material evidence that was used in the first official inquiry, in an Ecuadorian Air Force depot.  Reportedly among the evidence were some small remains of the ill-fated Super King Air. Chiriboga announced that some of that evidence would be sent to Brazil for further analysis; and that he would embark on further investigation, among military installations, to look out for more remains from the aircraft. The Roldós family asked to be kept informed on the new investigation. Chiriboga said that up to this discovery collaboration from the Armed Forces had been “cold”, but that “better disposition” now existed. It is worth noting that former Defense Minister Fernando Cordero had declared in 2015 that despite documentation having been declassified in 2013, several files had been incinerated and other documents lost, a fact that his institution would investigate. Cordero added that previous information requests by the Attorney General had been obstructed by missing or disorganized investigation records.

Legacy
Despite a downturn in his popularity during the last months of his administration, due to the post-war economic measures, Roldos’ death immortalized the last words of his famous speech delivered on the day of his death; at Atahualpa Stadium in front of a crowd of thousands, in which he called for national unity just before departing in his fatidic last journey to Loja, where he was meant to attend another ceremony for the fallen soldiers during the war with Peru:

"We have worked 21 months under a constitutional government when in countries like ours, having a democratic stability means conquering it daily".

"Ecuadorians, we were honest. We continue to be honest in each and all of our actions. Actions, not words, will prove our intentions. It’s the time of work and solidarity, not the time for strikes, threats or rumors. Let’s prove we love our country by complying our duties. Our great passion is and should always be Ecuador. Our great passion; listen to me, is and should be Ecuador".

"We don’t want this Ecuador to be enmeshed in the insignificant but in the most important, in the untiring, building up a destiny of nobility; a heroic Ecuador that won in Pichincha, an Ecuador with brave people, brave fighters from Paquisha, Machinaza and Mayaicu who died in action in the trenches. A heroic Ecuador of the Cóndor Mountain Range. An eternal and united Ecuador in the defense of its territory. A democratic Ecuador capable of teaching humanism, work and liberty. This Amazonian Ecuador, forever and always. Long live the Fatherland!."

After Roldós's death, his children left the country and the National Congress named Roldós's brother, León Roldós, as Vice President of Ecuador for the remainder of what would have been Jaime Roldós's term. León Roldós was later a candidate for president in 1992, 2002, and 2006. Jaime Roldós's daughter, Martha Roldós Bucaram, was a presidential candidate in the 2009 elections. Jaime Roldós's son, Santiago Roldós Bucaram, is a journalist and playwright. Jaime Roldós's brother-in-law, Abdalá Bucaram, founded the populist Ecuadorian Roldosist Party and was elected president of Ecuador. He governed from August 1996 to February 1997, when he was removed by the National Congress on the grounds of "mental incapacity". Martha Roldós has said that the Ecuadorian Roldosist Party has corrupted her father's ideals.

Jaime Roldós's most important legacy was his support for human rights. The Roldós Doctrine holds that the international community's concern for a country's internal human rights situation is not a violation of the country's sovereignty.

References

External links 
 

1940 births
1981 deaths
Presidents of Ecuador
Collars of the Order of Isabella the Catholic
State leaders killed in aviation accidents or incidents
Concentration of People's Forces politicians
People from Guayaquil
Victims of aviation accidents or incidents in Ecuador
Victims of aviation accidents or incidents in 1981